Wraith (Yuriko "Yuri" Watanabe) is a fictional character appearing in American comic books published by Marvel Comics.

Publication history 
Yuri Watanabe first appeared in The Amazing Spider-Man #600, and was created by Dan Slott and John Romita Jr. She first appeared as Wrath in The Amazing Spider-Man #663.

Fictional character biography 
Yuri Watanabe was a captain in the New York Police Department (NYPD) and an ally of Spider-Man's like her friend and mentor Jean DeWolff. However, she was shown to be frustrated with how the justice system and the police were unable to deal with powerful and wealthy criminals who could always find a way to escape justice for their crimes.

Shortly thereafter, a new vigilante, the Wraith, starts targeting Mister Negative's criminal syndicate. During one such attack, the Wraith unmasks to reveal DeWolff's face, although this is later revealed to be one of the Chameleon's masks stolen from police evidence. It is later revealed that the Wraith is really Yuri pretending to be DeWolff's ghost to scare the criminals of New York, using a costume in imitation of Spider-Man to achieve the results she sought.

Wraith accompanies forensic expert Carlie Cooper on a visit to Grand Tauró, where they pursue underworld financier Antoine Morant, searching for information on the secret bank account of the Superior Spider-Man (Otto Octavius's mind in Spider-Man's body). Carlie and the Wraith catch up with Morant shredding some documents out of fear. Carlie recovers one of the documents, discovering that all of the Superior Spider-Man's equipment and technology for the Arachnauts, as well as the order for Spiderlings, are being paid for using the secret account, putting Carlie one step closer to finding the evidence needed to prove the new Spider-Man's true identity.

After Carlie is kidnapped by the original Goblin King, Yuri investigates Otto hoping to find Carlie's whereabouts. She confronts Otto during the Goblin Nation's attack for info on Carlie but is knocked out by the transformed Carlie. She then aids the Avengers and their ally Cardiac against the Goblin Knight with assistance from Peter Parker who eventually regains his place as Spider-Man from Otto.

In the "Spiral" storyline, Yuri's faith in the justice system is permanently shattered when crime boss Tombstone is released from prison after gunning down one of her friends during a shootout with the police. She receives photographic evidence from Mister Negative that Judge Howell, who signed off on Tombstone's release, received a favor in return and arrests the judge without contacting the NYPD after obtaining more evidence as the Wraith with Spider-Man. She continues to receive tips from Mister Negative on where big crime lords such as Hammerhead and the second Goblin King are meeting so she and Spider-Man can take them down.

Spider-Man notices she is being more brutal in her approach and believes Mister Negative is using her. This is later proven right when Mister Negative begins to take over the territories of his incarcerated rivals and tries to frame the Wraith as a murderer. When Howell dies in prison from a stab wound, Yuri's superior confiscates her badge and she is dismissed from the force. After a fight with the Circus of Crime, she realizes she has been playing into Mister Negative's hands and kills one of his men, declaring that "Watanabe the cop" no longer exists and that only the Wraith is left. When she attempts to kill Mister Negative, Spider-Man tries to convince her to change her ways. She decides that killing criminals rather than arresting them is more fulfilling and attacks her former ally, but Spider-Man knocks her out and goes on to defeat Mister Negative himself. Spider-Man later finds Yuri has abandoned her costume, but kept her Wraith mask.

Powers and abilities 
The Wraith primarily used technology obtained by the police from various Spider-Man villains, including a mask of Jean DeWolff's face from Chameleon to hide her true identity, equipment designed by Mysterio, and Mister Fear's Fear Gas. Her primary weapons are yellow elastic straps attached to her costume that wrap up her enemies and allow her to swing around the city similar to Spider-Man.

Reception
 In 2021, Screen Rant included Wraith in their "Spider-Man: 10 Best Female Villains" list.

In other media

Television 
Yuri Watanabe appears in Spider-Man (2017), voiced by Sumalee Montano. This version is the NYPD's Chief of Police.

Video games 
 Yuri Watanabe / Wraith appears as a playable character in Spider-Man Unlimited.
 Yuri Watanabe appears in Marvel's Spider-Man, voiced by Tara Platt. Similarly to her comics counterpart, this version is an NYPD captain and long-time ally of Spider-Man's who aids him in foiling various crimes in New York. Additionally, she is a third-generation police officer whose father was arrested for taking bribes from Hammerhead and that Yuri has dedicated her entire career to bringing the crime boss down, going from precinct to precinct as her zealousness became too much. In The City That Never Sleeps DLC, she is emotionally compromised after her department and Spider-Man's attempt to capture Hammerhead results in the deaths of many of her officers. Taking matters into her own hands after becoming frustrated with Spider-Man's lack of progress, she goes on a violent quest for revenge against the crime lord. While trying to stop her, Spider-Man, with Mary Jane Watson's help, discovers Yuri's past. Once she catches up to Hammerhead, Yuri nearly shoots and kills him before Spider-Man narrowly redirects her shot. Despite being put on administrative leave for her actions, she refuses to give up her vendetta and goes into hiding. She later kills one of Hammerhead's top enforcers and uses crime scenes connected to him to lead Spider-Man to the enforcer's body, where she contacts her former ally to tell him she quit the force to become a vigilante, reasoning that the justice system does not work all the time.

References

External links 
 Wraith (Yuri Watanabe) at Marvel Wiki
 

Characters created by Dan Slott
Characters created by John Romita Jr.
Comics characters introduced in 2009
Fictional Japanese American people
Fictional New York City Police Department officers
Marvel Comics superheroes
Marvel Comics female superheroes
Marvel Comics police officers
Spider-Man characters
Vigilante characters in comics